The Detroit Lions Radio Network is a radio network in Michigan and Toledo, Ohio that broadcasts all of the NFL's Detroit Lions games and related programming. All preseason, regular season, and postseason games are aired live throughout the network.  The announcers are WJBK (Fox 2) sports director Dan Miller with play-by-play, former Lions offensive tackle Lomas Brown with color commentary, and former Lions guard T. J. Lang serving as sideline reporter. Network coverage begins two hours before game time and ends one hour after the game's conclusion. Games are also aired on Sirius XM Radio and online with a subscription to NFL Game Pass or TuneIn Premium. The Lions' flagship station returned to WXYT-FM starting with the 2021 season, after a five-year stint at WJR. As of the 2022 season, the network consists of 50 stations in 40 markets in Michigan and one in Ohio.

Station list

Blue background indicates low-power FM translator.
Gray background indicates station is a simulcast of another station.

History

Dan Miller has been the radio play-by-play voice of the Lions since 2005. Miller succeeded Mark Champion, who had called play-by-play for the team from 1989-2004.
Van Patrick called play-by-play from 1950 until his death in 1974.
Other past announcers for Lions radio include Frank Beckmann, Bob Reynolds, Dave Diles and Ray Lane.
Jim Brandstatter was the Lions' radio color commentator from 1987–2017.
Tony Ortiz provided Lions sideline reports from 2001 until 2016. He produced Lions games broadcasts from 1991-1994.
WXYT (AM) was the sole flagship station of the network from 1998-2004.
In 2005, the Lions' flagship became an FM station for the first time in their history, when a long term agreement was signed with WKRK (now WXYT-FM).
Detroit's WWJ was the team's flagship station prior to 1998, and continued to simulcast WXYT's broadcasts prior to the team's move to WKRK. Prior to 1989, WJR had served as the Lions' radio flagship.
Former names of the network include "The WXYT 1270 Detroit Lions Radio Network", "The WKRK Detroit Lions Radio Network", and "The Live 97.1 Detroit Lions Radio Network"  (WKRK-FM is WXYT-FM's former callsign, and Live 97.1 is one of its former brandings).
WXYT-FM was the Lions' flagship from 2004–2015.
On November 20, 2015, it was announced that the Detroit Lions would move to WJR beginning in the 2016 NFL season, ending the team's 20-year relationship with CBS Radio. Officials stated that CBS had dropped the team over demands that it censor on-air content that was critical of the team. In particular, the Lions specifically demanded that flagship station WXYT-FM fire popular on-air personality Mike Valenti as a condition of any extension to its broadcast rights since Valenti has had a history of making remarks critical of the Lions and their poor performance. WXYT-FM refused to do so, and he remains at the station.

See also
List of XM Satellite Radio channels
List of Sirius Satellite Radio stations
NFL on Westwood One
Detroit Lions Television Network

References

National Football League on the radio
Sports radio networks in the United States